These are some of the notable events relating to politics in 1973.

August - Sixpence withdrawn from general use in the UK marking the end of the decimalisation period.
24 September - Portuguese Guinea proclaims independence from Portugal as Guinea-Bissau.
18 October - Trygve Bratteli replaces Lars Korvald as prime minister of Norway.
18 December - Prime minister Anker Jørgensen of Denmark resigns and is replaced with Poul Hartling.

References

 
Politics by year
20th century in politics
1970s in politics